Friday the Thirteenth is a live album by the English rock band the Stranglers, released in 1997 by Eagle Records.

To mark the twenty-first anniversary of their original recording contract with United Artists Records, the Stranglers played to a sold out Royal Albert Hall (London, UK) with an eighteen-piece string orchestra (the Electra Strings). Friday the Thirteenth presents part of the set (these songs, plus the remainder of the set can be found on the accompanying DVD release). Composer and musician Jocelyn Pook makes contributions to the songs "Waltz in Black", "Valley of the Birds", "Daddy's Riding the Range", "Golden Brown" and "No More Heroes".

Critical reception

Jack Rabid, writing for AllMusic, gave the album a negative one-and-a-half star review, calling its sound "clear but dull, flat, and lifeless," and the production "soulless." He also criticised vocalist Paul Roberts' performance, clearly not satisfied with him as replacement for original singer Hugh Cornwell, calling him a "facile, slick hack." Rabid wrote, "hearing some damn great material butchered [by Roberts] is rock and roll sacrilege." On a positive note, Rabid felt that "the lovely string section adds a nice dimension, and the original three members remain solid and fierce." Rabid concluded that Friday the Thirteenth "is as welcome as vomit on the Albert Hall's beautiful red carpets."

Track listing

2007 Japanese reissue bonus tracks

Extra tracks on DVD release

Personnel
Credits adapted from the album liner notes.

 The Stranglers

 Paul Roberts – vocals
 Jean-Jacques Burnel – bass, vocals
 John Ellis – guitar, vocals
 Dave Greenfield – keyboards, vocals
 Jet Black – drums

 Additional musicians 
 The Electra Strings – strings
 Jocelyn Pook – string co-ordination

 Technical
 Recorded by the Manor Mobile
 Max Bisgrove – mixing 
 Dave Conroy – digital editing 
 John McMurtie – photography  
 Mark Cunningham – additional photography

References 

1997 live albums
The Stranglers live albums
2007 video albums
Live video albums
2007 live albums
Live albums recorded at the Royal Albert Hall